LKS may refer to:

Abbreviation of links, plural of a unit of length used by surveyors, 0.66 feet
LKS, not realised spaceplane based on Proton-K launcher and proposed by Soviet Vladimir Chelomey space company
Lakeside MRT station (MRT station abbreviation), a Mass Rapid Transit station in Jurong West, Singapore
Lambda Kappa Sigma, Fraternity
Lanarkshire, historic county in Scotland, Chapman code
Landau Kleffner Syndrome, childhood loss of speech faculty
LKS Goczałkowice-Zdrój, Polish football club
ŁKS Łódź, Polish sports club
ŁKS Łódź (women's basketball)
ŁKS Łomża, Polish football club